Nathan J. Kaplan (June 29, 1910 – March 15, 1997) was a lawyer, politician, and jurist.

Born in Chicago, Illinois, Kaplan went to Crane Junior College and received his J.D. degree from University of Chicago Law School. He was general counsel for the United Brother of Welders, Cutters and Helpers of America from 1942 to 1945. He practiced law in Chicago and was involved in the Democratic Party. From 1956 until 1962, Kaplan served in the Illinois House of Representatives. He then resigned to serve in the Chicago City Council from 1966 to 1966. From 1966 until his retirement in 1978, Kaplan served as an Illinois Circuit Court judge. Kaplan died at his home in Longboat Key, Florida.

Notes

1910 births
1997 deaths
Politicians from Chicago
Malcolm X College alumni
University of Chicago Law School alumni
Illinois state court judges
Chicago City Council members
Democratic Party members of the Illinois House of Representatives
20th-century American judges
People from Longboat Key, Florida
20th-century American politicians